Hedayat Lotfian is an Iranian retired military officer who served as Iran's Chief of police, the chief commander of Law Enforcement Force of Islamic Republic of Iran, from 1997 to 2000.

References

Living people
Islamic Revolutionary Guard Corps personnel of the Iran–Iraq War
Chief commanders of Law Enforcement Force of Islamic Republic of Iran
Year of birth missing (living people)